Kiichirō, Kiichiro or Kiichirou (written: 麒一郎, 喜一郎 or 季一郎) is a masculine Japanese given name. Notable people with the name include:

, Japanese astronomer
 (1888–1970), Japanese general
 (1867–1952), Japanese politician and Prime Minister of Japan
 (1894–1952), Japanese businessman
 (1920–1998), Japanese-American sumo wrestler

Japanese masculine given names